The Turtleville Iron Bridge is an overhead truss bridge built in 1887 where South Lathers Road crosses Turtle Creek near Beloit, Wisconsin. It was added to the National Register of Historic Places in 1977.

Turtleville was settled in 1838, growing around a dam and mill and once including a distillery, a store, a blacksmith shop, a school, church, and the once-elegant Hodson House. Turtleville has since withered into a ghost town, but the cemetery and bridge survive from that era.

The bridge is a single-span, Pratt truss bridge built by the Wisconsin Bridge and Iron Company, and is perhaps one of its earlier truss bridges. The structure includes eye bars, pin connections, counter rods with turnbuckles, and a wooden deck. Around 1890 bridge construction was transitioning from wrought iron to steel, and the bridge is a rare surviving example of the earlier technology.

See also
List of bridges documented by the Historic American Engineering Record in Wisconsin

References

External links

Buildings and structures in Beloit, Wisconsin
Road bridges on the National Register of Historic Places in Wisconsin
Bridges completed in 1887
Historic American Engineering Record in Wisconsin
National Register of Historic Places in Rock County, Wisconsin
Pratt truss bridges in the United States
Iron bridges in the United States